The CDU Baden-Württemberg is the political party with the most members in the German state of Baden-Württemberg and the second largest state party (in German, Landespartei or Landesverband) of the Christian Democratic Union of Germany with almost 65,000 members. Its chairman is Thomas Strobl, who succeeded Stefan Mappus after the lost 2011 election.

Its predecessors were the Badische Christlich-Soziale Volkspartei (BCSV), the Christlich-demokratische Partei (CDP), and the Christlich-Soziale Volkspartei.

The state party was founded in January 1971, when the state parties of CDU Nordbaden, Südbaden, Nordwürttemberg, and Württemberg-Hohenzollern merged into a single party. The first chairman was Hans Filbinger.

The CDU has been the governing party of Baden-Württemberg continuously from 1953 to 2011, the year Winfried Kretschmann of the Alliance '90/Greens won the regional state elections.

Election results and coalitions 

The CDU Baden-Württemberg won absolute majorities in the 5 state elections between 1972 and 1988, and could govern the state alone. Otherwise the party cooperated with other parties. Until 1958, it cooperated with all parties represented in the parliament. The SPD withdrew from the cooperation in 1958. From 1964 CDU cooperated with FDP/DVP. In the elections of 1968, the SPD won 29% and the NPD won 10%. A grand coalition of CDU and SPD lasted from 1968 to 1972. A new grand coalition lasted from 1992 to 1996. Since 1996, the CDU is cooperating with the FDP.

Chairmen

Nord-Württemberg

Nord-Baden

Süd-Baden

Württemberg-Hohenzollern

Baden-Württemberg

Honorary chairmen

Chairs of the parliamentary faction

References

Literature 
 Weinacht, Paul-Ludwig (Hg.): Die CDU in Baden-Württemberg und ihre Geschichte. Mit einem Geleitwort von Hans Filbinger. Stuttgart 1978. (Schriften zur politischen Landeskunde Baden-Württembergs, 2)
 Günther Buchstab, Klaus Gotto: Die Gründung der Union, München 1981, Seite 88–91

External links
CDU BW
Grundsatzprogramm der CDU BW
Regierungsprogramm der CDU BW

Christian Democratic Union of Germany
Politics of Baden-Württemberg
State sections of political parties in Germany